Walter De Greef (born 12 November 1957) is a retired Belgian footballer.

Club career
During his career, the white-haired de Greef played for R.S.C. Anderlecht and Sporting Lokeren.

International career
He earned 5 caps for the Belgium national football team, and participated in UEFA Euro 1984.

Honours

Player 

 Anderlecht

 Belgian First Division: 1984–85, 1985–86
 Belgian Supercup: 1985
UEFA Cup: 1982–83 (winners), 1983-84 (runners-up)
 Jules Pappaert Cup: 1983, 1985
 Bruges Matins: 1985

References

External links
Royal Belgian Football Association: Number of caps
 Profile & stats - Lokeren

1957 births
Living people
Footballers from Limburg (Belgium)
Belgian footballers
Belgium international footballers
UEFA Euro 1984 players
R.S.C. Anderlecht players
Wiener Sport-Club players
K.S.C. Lokeren Oost-Vlaanderen players
K. Patro Eisden Maasmechelen players
K. Beringen F.C. players
People from Beringen, Belgium
UEFA Cup winning players

Association football midfielders